Valarie Pettiford (born July 8, 1960) is an American stage and television actress, dancer, and jazz singer. She received a Tony Award nomination for her role in the broadway production Fosse. She is also known for her role as "Big Dee Dee" Thorne on the UPN television sitcom Half & Half.

Stage
Pettiford began her career as a dancer and choreographer in Bob Fosse productions on Broadway. Alvin Klein of the New York Times wrote of her role in the 1983 musical revue Ladies and Gentlemen, Jerome Kern! that "You will not for a moment take your eyes off Valarie Pettiford, the show's standout: a sinewy dancer who can be sultry or sweet, measure for measure, as prescribed.... Miss Pettiford appears to be a superbly trained dancer, schooled in balletic finesse and Broadway-style razzmatazz - and a stunning presence." Leah Frank, also in the NYT, wrote of Pettiford's appearance in West Side Story in 1987: "The mainstay of the supporting cast is Valarie Pettiford, whose Anita is spicy, sensual and full of fire. She is an exciting actress who has a special quality needed to ignite a number such as America."

In 1994, she played lesbian Cassandra Keefer in The Naked Truth, and from 1995 to 1996 starred as Julie in a touring production of Show Boat.

Pettiford received a Tony nomination as Best Featured Actress in a Musical and a Dora Mavor Moore Award nomination for her role in the Broadway production Fosse from 1998 to 1999. Variety said Pettiford gave "a coolly elegant vocal rendition, [and she] is also a sultry, powerful dancer." She left Fosse to appear as Velma Kelly in Chicago in the West End in London from August 1999 to February 2000, alongside Chita Rivera as Roxie Hart.

In 2007 Pettiford won the Backstage Bistro Award for her cabaret debut at the Metropolitan Room in New York City, and won an NAACP Theatre Award for her lead role in The Wild Party. In 2008, she starred in a solo show, Valarie Pettiford - Thankful that played in New York City and Los Angeles. In 2009, she starred in the solo show Valarie Pettiford - The Concert in New York City.

Film
In 1978, at the age of 17 and enrolled at the High School of Performing Arts,  Pettiford did her first-ever movie work as part of the large ensemble in the film The Wiz. She starred as Mariah Carey's mother in the 2001 film Glitter, had a role in Stomp the Yard in 2007, and played Aunt Geneva in the 2011 film, Jumping the Broom.

Television
In the 1990s, Pettiford appeared on daytime soap operas, including Another World and One Life to Live (where she originated the role of Sheila Price). Her Half & Half role from 2002 to 2006 as Dee Dee Thorne gained her three NAACP Image Award nominations. From 2008 to 2009, she played Sandra Lucas in the comedy-drama series Tyler Perry's House of Payne. She also appeared in the HBO pilot Anatomy of Hope, directed by J. J. Abrams. Pettiford plays a recurring role as the wife to Harold Cooper (Harry Lennix), Assistant Director of the FBI Counter-Terrorism Division, on the NBC drama The Blacklist.

She has also starred in the TV series A Discovery of Witches as the witch Emily Mather

Music
While on Half & Half, Pettiford released a jazz album, Hear My Soul, in 2005.

Personal life
Pettiford was born in Queens, New York to Ralph and Blanch Pettiford, and graduated from the High School of Performing Arts in 1978. She is married to her manager, actor and former Philadelphia Phillies pitcher Tony Rader. They got engaged in 1991.

Filmography

Film/Movie

Television

Stage roles
The Wiz (2006), Aunt Em
The Wild Party (2005)
He Hunts (2002), Leontine Duchotel
Gentlemen Prefer Blondes (2002), Dorothy Shaw
Chicago (August 1999—February 2000), Velma Kelly
Fosse (1998—99)
Show Boat (1995—96), Julie
Freefall (1994)
The Naked Truth (1994), Cassandra Keefer
Weird Romance (1992), Shannara and other roles
West Side Story (1987), Anita
Big Deal (1986), Pearl, dance captain
Ladies and Gentlemen, Jerome Kern (1985), choreographer
Grind (1985), Fleta
Dancin' (1979), performer
Sophisticated Ladies (1978), a sophisticated lady and understudy for Miss Jamison, dance captain
A Broadway Musical (1978), swing performer
Summer and Smoke
The Balcony
Beehive
Tango Apasionato
Sarah and Abraham
She Stoops to Conquer
Sweet Charity

References

External links

1960 births
Living people
Actresses from New York City
American female dancers
American dancers
American film actresses
American musical theatre actresses
American stage actresses
American television actresses
African-American actresses
People from Queens, New York
20th-century American actresses
21st-century American actresses
Dancers from New York (state)